Walter Henri Dyett (also known as Captain Walter Henri Dyett; January 11, 1901 – November 17, 1969) was an American violinist and music educator in the Chicago Public Schools system. He served as music director and assistant music director at Chicago's predominantly African-American high schools; Phillips High School and DuSable High School. Dyett served as musical director at DuSable High School from its opening in 1935 until 1962. He trained many students who became professional musicians.

Career 
After studying pre-medical courses at University of California, Berkeley, Dyett returned to his home town of Chicago, where he worked in vaudeville orchestras and directed an Army band, after which he was known as Captain Dyett. In 1931, he became assistant musical director and later musical director at Wendell Phillips High School in Chicago and, in 1935, moved to DuSable High School when it opened. He received his B.M. degree at VanderCook College of Music (Chicago) in 1938, and his M.M. degree at the Chicago Musical College in 1942.

DuSable High School

Students
Among the musicians who studied in Dyett's program are:

 Gene Ammons
 Fred Below
 Ronnie Boykins
 Oscar Brashear
 Homer Brown
 Wilbur Campbell
 Sonny Cohn
 Nat King Cole
 Jerome Cooper
 Richard Davis
 Bo Diddley
 Dorothy Donegan
 Jimmy Ellis
 George Freeman
 Von Freeman
 John Gilmore
 Bennie Green
 Johnny Griffin
 Eddie Harris
 Johnny Hartman
 Milt Hinton (at Phillips)
 Fred Hopkins
 Joseph Jarman
 Leroy Jenkins
 Clifford Jordan
 Claude McLin
 Jesse Miller
 John E. Myatt
 Pat Patrick
 Walter Perkins
 Julian Priester
 Wilbur Ware 
 Dinah Washington
 John Young 
Redd Foxx

Death/Legacy 
Dyett died on November 17, 1969, aged 68.  He is commemorated by Dyett High School, a Chicago public high school located in the Washington Park neighborhood in Chicago.

Bibliography 
"DU SABLE HIGH MUSIC CHIEF A STAR MAKER by Roi Ottley - Chicago Daily Tribune (1872-1963); Jan 9, 1960; pg. B12" for more biographical information.
An Autobiobraphy of Black Jazz by Dempsey J. Travis (1983)

References 

1901 births
1969 deaths
American music educators
Musicians from Chicago
20th-century American musicians
Educators from Illinois